Vladimir Iosifovich Sloutsker (born Moscow, 27 August 1956) is a Russian businessman and former senator who represented Chuvash Republic in the Russian parliament. Sloutsker is the co-founder and President of the Israeli Jewish Congress.

In 2012, Sloutsker lost a legal battle with his ex-wife over the ownership of a house in London.

In 2015, Sloutsker won damages over stories critical of him that appeared on the internet.

References

External links

Russian Jews
Politicians from Moscow
Living people
1956 births
Businesspeople from Moscow
Russian businesspeople in the United Kingdom
Members of the Federation Council of Russia (after 2000)